Joseph Maphosa (born 7 April 1994) is a Zimbabwe-born British professional boxer.

Early life
Joseph Maphosa was born on 7 April 1994 in Beitbridge, Zimbabwe, where he grew up with his parents and two brothers. When Maphosa was 9, his father, a maths teacher and part-time accountant, emigrated to England in an attempt to find work and provide a better life for his wife and three sons. His father eventually settled in Middlesbrough, and after saving up enough money Joe and his two brothers flew to England to join his father. He attended St. Pius X primary school in Middlesbrough where he gained an interest in cricket. His interest in boxing came after watching Bernard Hopkins fight on TV, saying, "I enjoyed playing cricket and running around in the playground at school, but then I saw a clip of Bernard Hopkins on TV and I liked what he was doing so I decided to get myself to a Boxercise class for general fitness to begin with but and that led onto me going to Middlesbrough ABC and from there I have never looked back."

Amateur career
In an amateur career that spanned 75 fights with approximately 60 wins, Maphosa reached the finals of two ABA Championships; in 2012 he was defeated by Reece Bellotti in the bantamweight final and fell short against Sunny Edwards in the 2015 light-flyweight final. He also competed for the British Lionhearts at the 2015 World Series of Boxing, losing a split decision to Cuban Domadores' Joahnys Argilagos at the York Hall in London.

Professional career
Signed with Frank Warren's Queensberry Promotions, Maphosa made his professional debut on 13 May 2017, scoring a four-round points decision (PTS) victory over Gary Reeve at the First Direct Arena in Leeds, England.

Following four consecutive wins, he scored his first stoppage victory on 28 April 2018 at the Temple Park Leisure Centre in South Shields, stopping Steven Maguire via technical knockout (TKO) in the fourth and final round.

Professional boxing record

References

Living people
1994 births
British male boxers
Zimbabwean male boxers
Zimbabwean emigrants to the United Kingdom
Sportspeople from Matabeleland South Province
Flyweight boxers